A special election was held in  on April 6, 1812 to fill the vacancy left by the resignation of Barzillai Gannett (DR) who resigned sometime in 1812 without having served.

Election returns

Carr took his seat June 3, 1812

See also
List of special elections to the United States House of Representatives

References

United States House of Representatives 1812 17
Massachusetts 1812 17
Massachusetts 1812 17
1812 17
Massachusetts 17
United States House of Representatives 17